Dealu Morii is a commune in Bacău County, Western Moldavia, Romania. It is composed of fourteen villages: Banca, Bălănești, Blaga, Boboș, Bodeasa, Bostănești, Calapodești, Căuia, Dealu Morii, Dorofei, Ghionoaia, Grădești, Negulești and Tăvădărești.

References

Communes in Bacău County
Localities in Western Moldavia